Irfanuddin (born 21 September 1982) is a Pakistani first-class cricketer who played for Karachi cricket team.

References

External links
 

1982 births
Living people
Pakistani cricketers
Karachi cricketers
Cricketers from Karachi